N.E.J. Stevenson Ltd are designers and manufacturers of bespoke furniture and architectural joinery located in Rugby, Warwickshire.

History 
From humble beginnings in a domestic garage in 1984, NEJ Stevenson are world renowned designers and manufacturers of bespoke furniture and architectural joinery and honoured to be cabinetmakers to The Queen and Royal Warrant holders. The company has developed a reputation for crafting the finest contemporary and heritage furniture. From individual pieces to entire room interiors NEJ Stevenson’s furniture can be found within luxurious private residences, historic buildings, places of worship and high-end retail spaces.

When owner and Managing Director Neil Stevenson started the company in 1984, he worked to the principles of delivering the client’s vision with skill, quality and service.  37 years later the company has grown - from humble beginnings in a domestic garage – the business now boasts 40 staff members and has an extensive purpose-built workshops.

NEJ Stevenson have enjoyed working in major historical buildings and establishing relationships with important institutions from English Heritage to the Vatican and the National Trust to the Church of England as well as highly contemporary work in high gloss and metal for leading designers and patrons.

As befitting a company honoured to be the cabinetmakers to Her Majesty the Queen, all of our furniture is designed and made to the highest standards. Every piece is one of a kind, both in terms of design and materials, painstakingly sourced for every commission. We enjoy working with the world’s most renowned interior designers, architects, developers and luxury brands as well as private clients; all share a deep appreciation of the beauty of wood and the skill of the craftspeople who work with it.

Neil Stevenson received his royal warrant of appointment from Queen Elizabeth II in February 2003, following many commissions dating back to 1992. NEJ Stevenson was highly involved in the re-furbishment after the 1992 Windsor Castle fire, recreating a number of destroyed furniture such as the state dining room sideboard, which was 19 feet long and made out of rare rosewood and oak and gilded, originally designed by Augustus Pugin (1812-1852). It had to be replicated by only using some photographs and some descriptions.

References

External links 
 Homepage of N.E.J. Stevenson
 Art Workers Guild | Neil Stevenson

British Royal Warrant holders